Edappadi K. Palaniswami (born 12 May 1954), also known as E.P.S., is an Indian politician and the leader of opposition in the Tamil Nadu Legislative Assembly. He served as the 7th chief minister of Tamil Nadu, from 2017 to 2021. He has been the Interim General Secretary of All India Anna Dravida Munnetra Kazhagam Since 11 July 2022, which was upheld by the Supreme Court of India on 23 February 2023. Palaniswami served as the Joint Coordinator of the AIADMK from 2017 to 2022. He also served as the Headquarters Secretary of the AIADMK from 2014 to 2022.

Palaniswami has represented Edappadi since 2011 as Member of the Legislative Assembly, previously serving from 1989 to 1996. In the 1998 Indian general election he was elected as Member of Parliament of the Lok Sabha representing Tiruchengode.

When AIADMK won the 2011 Tamil Nadu Legislative Assembly election, he was given a ministerial berth by J. Jayalalithaa and served as the Minister of Highways and Minor Ports on 16 May 2011 for the government of Tamil Nadu. After 2016 Tamil Nadu Legislative Assembly election victory, he was given the additional responsibility of Ministry of Public Works by J. Jayalalithaa.

Personal life 
Palaniswami was born on 12 May 1954 to Karuppa Gounder and Thavasiyammal at Siluvampalayam, Salem, Madras State, India (now in Tamil Nadu, India). His parents were farmers. After completing school, he enrolled for B.Sc. degree in Sri Vasavi College but did not graduate. He was the students union leader at college. He has a brother Govindraj and a sister Ranjitham. He is married to Ratha Palaniswami and has one son and is an agriculturalist by occupation.

Political career 

Palaniswami entered politics as a volunteer for the AIADMK in 1974. Later he became the key member of the party in Salem district. He was first elected to the Tamil Nadu Legislative Assembly in 1989, representing Edappadi constituency, and won re-election in 1991. He was elected Member of Parliament, representing Tiruchengodu constituency in the 12th Lok Sabha. He emerged a dominant force in the AIADMK in the Western belt during late 1990s. He was appointed Propaganda Secretary in July 2006 and Organizing Secretary in 2007.  He was elected from Edappadi constituency in 2011 and 2016 when the AIADMK emerged as a ruling party. He slowly gained prominence as one of the strong confidants of J.Jayalalithaa along with O. Paneerselvam and Dindigul C.Sreenivasan. He served as the Minister of Highways and Minor Ports in the J. Jayalalithaa, O. Panneerselvam and in his own ministry from 2011. In 2014, he was appointed headquarters secretary of Aiadmk, by succeeding K. A. Sengottaiyan.

Chief Minister, 2017-2021

Palaniswami became the Chief Minister of Tamil Nadu in February 2017, following the resignation of O. Panneerselvam, who became chief minister after the demise of former chief minister J. Jayalalithaa who won the 2016 Legislative Assembly election as CM candidate of AIADMK. He was sworn in on 16 February 2017 before a crowd of party workers, along with his 32-member cabinet. Palaniswami also holds the charge of Home, Prohibition & Excise Departments along with the other portfolios normally held by the Chief Ministers, and not mentioned elsewhere. He is elected from Edappadi constituency. During his reign, he introduced various schemes like Kudimaramaththu Work, FAME India scheme and Amma Patrol in Tamil Nadu to ascertain the security of women and children in public places.

In May 2018, police opened fire on protests against a Sterlite plant that was polluting local groundwater in Thoothukudi, killing 13 people. While ordering a one-man commission into the violence, Palaniswami also declared the shootings were in "self-defence."

On 28 May, Palaniswami led Tamil Nadu Government ordered the permanent closure of the Sterlite Copper plant. “The Amma government has issued an order to have the Sterlite plant closed down permanently in deference to the sentiments of the people of Thoothukudi,” then Chief Minister Edappadi K. Palaniswami told journalists in the evening after chairing a meeting of his party legislators at the AIADMK headquarters in Chennai.

However, during the 2019 elections, AIADMK contested in alliance with the BJP and was swept out of parliament when the DMK-led alliance won 38 out of 39 seats in the state.

In 2019 he went on a 13-day tour in the United States, United Kingdom and United Arab Emirates to promote foreign investment in Tamil Nadu. While there he launched the Yaadhum Oore programme (lit. all countries, based on Puranauru 192) to encourage the Tamil diaspora to re-invest in Tamil Nadu, in the same line as other states with large NRI populations such as Kerala. During trip he secured 3 lakh crores worth of foreign investment, a greater amount than even his predecessor Jayalalithaa did.

In February 2020, Palaniswami led Tamil Nadu government declared the Cauvery delta region as a Protected Special Agriculture Zone. The announcement was widely hailed by political parties and farmers organisations.

In 2020, Palaniswami led AIADMK government passed order for 7.5% Quota in Medical Admissions for Govt. School Students. He took action to set up government medical colleges in newly formed 11 districts which offered 1,650 more seats to then existing 3,400 seats.

Under his governance, Tamil Nadu was rated as the best governed state based on a composite index in the context of sustainable development according to the Public Affairs Index-2020 released by the Public Affairs Centre in Oct. 2020. Palaniswami is also praised for his administration during the coronavirus pandemic. Tamil Nadu was one of the few states that did not register negative growth in the period of pandemic.

During his regime, Tamil Nadu was the best performing big state overall from the year 2018 to 2021. With a gross state domestic product of $290 billion or Rs 21.6 lakh crore, Tamil Nadu became India's second-largest economy.

In 2020, the study “States of the State” of India Today, said that Palaniswami led Tamil Nadu has topped in 11 categories from a total of 12, including economy, tourism, infrastructure, inclusive development, law and order, along with entrepreneurship, cleanliness, environment, health, education and agriculture. Tamil Nadu had been chosen for this recognition for the third consecutive year.

On 3 May 2021, Palaniswami resigned as Chief Minister following AIADMK's defeat in the 2021 Tamil Nadu Assembly Election.

Leader of the Opposition, 2021
After the party lost the assembly elections in May 2021, Palaniswami won the Edappadi constituency and was elected as the Leader Of the Opposition in Tamil Nadu Legislative Assembly.

Leadership Tussle with O. Panneerselvam, 2022
On 14 June 2022, citing the party's troubles in the polls, AIADMK district secretaries and other senior party members spoke out to shun the “dual leadership” system and came out publicly in favor of strong unitary leader to strengthen the organisation.

Edappadi K. Palaniswami supporters pushed for the change in the party's leadership structure by staging a political coup against AIADMK Coordinator O. Panneerselvam, who had become weak within the party. According to many sources, of the AIADMK's 75 district secretaries, hardly 10 supported him. Of the party's 66 MLAs, only five MLAs were reportedly on O. Panneerselvam side and less than 20 percent of the party's general council members behind him ahead of crucial general council meeting on 23 June 2022, which was expected to elect the single leadership to the party.

On 23 June 2022, A. Tamil Magan Hussain was unanimously elected as the Presidium Chairman of the party at a general council meeting held at the Shrivaaru Venkatachalapathy Palace in Vanagaram, Chennai.

On 30 June 2022, Edappadi K. Palaniswami wrote a letter to O. Panneerselvam asserting the latter ceased to be the party coordinator as the amendments made to the party's bylaw in the 2020 December executive committee meeting were not recognised in the general council meeting held on 23 June.

Interim General Secretary of AIADMK
On 11 July 2022, The Party General Council abolished the dual leadership model and empowered Edappadi K. Palaniswami to be the Party Chief. The General Council also expelled the Treasurer O. Panneerselvam and his loyalists R. Vaithilingam, P. H. Manoj Pandian, J. C. D. Prabhakar from their respective posts and primary memberships of the party for "anti-party" activities.

On 11 July 2022, Edappadi K. Palaniswami was unanimously elected as the Interim General Secretary of the party at a general council meeting held at the Shrivaaru Venkatachalapathy Palace in Vanagaram, Chennai. On 17 August, the Madras High Court however nullified the decisions of the AIADMK General Council and ordered mainitaing the status quo as on 23 June 2022. On 2 September 2022, a division bench of the Madras High Court upheld the decisions of the AIADMK general council meeting held on 11 July 2022 and set aside the previous court order of the single judge in the appeal case of Edappadi K. Palaniswami, thus effectively restoring unitary leadership. 

On 23 February 2023, the Supreme Court of India upheld the decisions of the AIADMK general council meeting held on 11 July 2022, and dismissed the petition of O. Panneerselvam challenging the previous order of the division bench, thus affirming unitary leadership under Edappadi K Palaniswami.

Elections contested and positions held

Lok Sabha elections

Tamil Nadu Legislative elections

Posts in Parliament of India

Posts in Tamil Nadu Legislative Assembly

See also 

 Edappadi K. Palaniswami ministry

References

External links
 Official Biographical Sketch in Lok Sabha Website 
 Official Biographical Sketch in Tamil Nadu Assembly Website 
 

All India Anna Dravida Munnetra Kazhagam politicians
Chief ministers from All India Anna Dravida Munnetra Kazhagam
Living people
20th-century Indian politicians
21st-century Indian politicians
Indian Tamil politicians
Tamil Nadu politicians
State cabinet ministers of Tamil Nadu
People from Salem district
Tamil Nadu MLAs 2011–2016
Tamil Nadu MLAs 2016–2021
1954 births
Lok Sabha members from Tamil Nadu
India MPs 1998–1999
Chief Ministers of Tamil Nadu
Tamil Nadu MLAs 1991–1996
Tamil Nadu MLAs 2021–2026